Marjorie Armida Herrera Pérez (born 22 January 2001) is a Salvadoran chess player. She competed in the 42nd Chess Olympiad in 2016, held in Baku, at the age of 15. She has won the Salvadoran Women's Chess Championship twice (2016 and 2019).

Awards
 Notable Athlete from El Salvador, Awarded by the Legislative Assembly of El Salvador (Outstanding career, 2014)

References

External links
 

2001 births
Living people
Salvadoran female chess players
Sportspeople from San Salvador